Human Rights is a studio album by American jazz trumpeter Wadada Leo Smith. The album was released in 1986 via Kabell and Gramm labels.

Track listing

Personnel
Leo Smith – trumpet, vocals, mbira
Stanya – electric guitar, synthesizer
Michele Navazio – acoustic guitar, bass [synthesizer]
James Emery – electric guitar
Thurman Barker – drums
Peter Kowald – bass, tuba, percussion
Guenter Sommer – drums, percussion
Tadao Sawai – koto, percussion

References

Wadada Leo Smith albums
1986 albums